Hesar-e Qarah Baghi (also Romanized as Ḩeşār-e Qarah Bāghī and Ḩeşār Qareh Bāghī; also known as Ḩeşār and Ḩeşāri) is a village in Simineh Rud Rural District, in the Central District of Bahar County, Hamedan Province, Iran. At the 2006 census, its population was 945, in 197 families.

References 

Populated places in Bahar County